The Omaha Traction Company was a privately owned public transportation business in Omaha, Nebraska. Created in the early 1900s by wealthy Omaha banker Gurdon Wattles, the company was involved in a series of contentious disputes with organized labor.

History 

Gurdon Wattles bought the Omaha and Council Bluffs Railway and Bridge Company, or O&CB, along with several competing local lines and merged them into one unit called the Omaha Traction Company in the early 1900s. Wattles continued using the O&CB brand. In 1943, the company began training women as streetcar operators after many of its male drivers were called into military service during World War II. The women learned quickly and were paid the same wages as their male counterparts. The company disbanded with the creation of Metro Area Transit in the early 1970s.

Labor relations 

The Amalgamated Association of Street and Electric Railway Employees attempted to unionize workers in Omaha Traction Company in the first decade of the 20th century with an organizer arriving in the city in 1902. That early effort faded within a year; however, Gurdon Wattles formed the Omaha Business Men's Association within the year to fight the prospect of losing the city's open shop status.

Wattles resisted any unionization within his businesses, as well as the city. When workers struck in early September 1909 he quickly hired strikebreakers from across the country to cross picket lines. He further provoked unionizers by publicly refusing arbitration in two of the city's business community's organs, the Omaha Bee and the Omaha Herald. Starting September 19, 1909 mobs rioted in the streets of downtown destroying streetcars, terrorizing company officials and attacking strikebreakers. Wattles kept the strikebreakers on, hiring others from Eastern United States cities to come in until the strikers agreed to his terms. Wattles later wrote a booklet about the events entitled A Crime Against Labor: A brief history of the Omaha and Council Bluffs Street Railway Strike, 1909. In the book he referred to the strikebreakers as, "a jolly lot of disreputables, always ready for a fight." The riots continued through September 23, 1909, eventually subsiding to the pressure of the strikebreakers.

In April 1935 the fragile truce between pro-open shop management of the Omaha Traction Company and pro-union labor forces broke, causing a long, violent strike. The company hired strikebreakers from Brooklyn and several other Eastern cities.  Within days the company rolled out heavily fortified streetcars, complete with windows covered by heavy wire and armed guards on board.  While few cars attracted passengers, the cars initially encountered little resistance. The company resisted calls for arbitration from the Omaha City Council and continued employing strikebreakers. In early May violence broke out, with workers' attacking the streetcars and strikebreakers by rifle attacks, violent beatings and bombings across the city. In June riots broke out with mobs' burning streetcars and looting.  There were two deaths. The city government lost control of the violence and called in the National Guard, which sent 103 officers and 1,273 enlisted men to restore order.  Governor Robert Cochran declared martial law and ordered the streetcars to stop running. After the governor intervened and owner Wattles agreed to arbitration, a number of agreements were made with workers' representatives. But no substantive changes were made  and strikebreakers stayed on the job. The violence ended, court cases ensued, and the situation slowly faded.

On June 14, 1935, Omaha was put under martial law as the result of three days of streetcar strike rioting in which a man was killed and more than ninety persons, including women and children, were wounded. Governor Robert Leroy Cochran ordered arbitration later in the week; however, new riots were reported by the end of the month. 1,800 National Guardsmen were called in to quell the violence. The final count was two people killed and 100 injured.

The Omaha Traction Company never unionized.

See also
 Transportation in Omaha
 History of Omaha
 Omaha Streetcar

References

Passenger rail transportation in Nebraska
Tram, urban railway and trolley companies
Labor disputes in Nebraska
Rail transportation labor disputes in the United States
Streetcars in Omaha, Nebraska
Defunct companies based in Nebraska
Labor-related riots in the United States
Crimes in Omaha, Nebraska
1904 establishments in Nebraska
1971 disestablishments in Nebraska
Riots and civil disorder in Nebraska